Barr is an English, Scottish, and Irish surname, and may refer to:

People
 Adam Barr, American television screenwriter and producer
 Al Barr (born 1968), lead singer of the Celtic punk band the Dropkick Murphys
 Alfred Barr (1902–1981), art historian and the first director of the Museum of Modern Art in New York City
 Alwyn Barr (born 1938), Texas historian 
 Amelia Edith Huddleston Barr (1831–1919), British American novelist 
 Andrew Barr (born 1973), Australian politician
 Andrew Barr (musician) (born 1977), drummer with The Sip and The Barr Brothers
 Anthony Barr (born 1992), American football linebacker
 Anthony James Barr (Tony Barr; Jim Barr; born 1940), American programming language designer, software engineer, and inventor
 Billy Barr (footballer), English footballer and coach
 Billy Barr (naturalist), famous for collecting 40 years of climate change data
 Bob Barr (born 1948), American politician
 Burton Barr (1917-1997), American politician from Arizona
 Candy Barr (1935–2005) American stripper, burlesque exotic dancer, actress, and model
 Charlie Barr (1864–1911), Record breaking Scottish sailor
 Colin Barr, Scottish curler
 Daisey Douglas Barr, leader of the Indiana Women's Ku Klux Klan in the early 1920s and member of the Women's Christian Temperance Union
 Daniel Barr, American fighter pilot and chocolate chip cookie connoisseur 
 Darren Barr, Scottish footballer
 Dave Barr (born 1972), American football quarterback
 Dave Barr (born 1952), Canadian golfer
 Dave Barr (born 1960), Canadian ice hockey player
 Dave Barr (born 1953), American veteran and motorcyclist who circumnavigated the globe despite having both legs amputated
 David Barr (born 1946), former Australian politician
 David Barr (born 1959), Canadian Colonel
 David Barr (born 1970), English cricketer
 Donald Barr (novelist), science fiction writer and New York Times book reviewer
 Donna Barr (born 1952), American comic book author and cartoonist 
 Douglas Barr (born 1949), American actor, writer and director 
 Eric Barr (born 1960), American geologist, entrepreneur, and fiscal manager 
 Felicity Barr (born 1970), British journalist
 Freeman Barr (born 1973), Bahamian boxer
 Gerry Barr, 1996 recipient of the Pearson Medal of Peace
 Glenn Barr (1932–2017), former Northern Ireland politician 
 Hugh C. Barr (1878–1960), philatelist of New York City
 Jean-Marc Barr (born 1960), French-American film actor and director
 Jeremiah Hess Barr (1876–1955), Pennsylvania philatelist
 Joel Barr (1916–1998), member of the Soviet Atomic Spy Ring 
 Julia Barr (born 1949), American actress
 Kathleen Barr (born 1967), Canadian voice actor
 Leonard Barr (1903–1980), standup American comedian
 Les Barr (born 1953), Scottish footballer
 Margaret Barr (choreographer) (1904-1991), Australian dance-drama choreographer
 Mark Barr, American mathematician
 Michelle Barr (born 1978), Scottish footballer
 Natalie Barr (born 1968), Australian journalist and television presenter
 Nevada Barr (born 1952), American author 
 Nicky Barr (1915–2006), Australian rugby player and World War II Veteran
 Niki Barr, American musician
 Norman B. Barr (1868–1943), founder of Olivet Institute in Chicago, Illinois
 Patrick Barr (1908–1985), British actor
 Rachel Barr, member of faculty of Georgetown University
 Richard J. Barr (1865-1951), American lawyer and politician
 Robert Barr (born 1978), Scottish field hockey player 
 Roseanne Barr (born 1952), American comedian, actress and writer
 Russell Barr (born ), minister of the Church of Scotland
 The Barr family of American professional wrestlers:
 Sandy Barr (1938–2007; born Ferrin Barr), family patriarch; also a promoter
 Ferrin Barr Jr. (born 1959), older son best known as Jimmy Jack Funk
 Art Barr (1966–1994), younger son
 Samuel Russell Barr (1914-2001), American businessman and politician
 Stringfellow Barr (1897–1982), historian, author and former president of St. John's College in Annapolis, Maryland
 Steven Barr (born 1962), American pastor, author and leader of Cast Member Church at Walt Disney World, Orlando, Florida
 Tara Lynne Barr (born 1993), American actress
 Terry Barr, former American football wide receiver
 Thomas D. Barr (1931–2008), prominent lawyer at Cravath, Swaine & Moore
 William Barr (born 1950), American lawyer and government official
 Woodrow Wilson Barr (1918–1942), United States Marine
 Yvonne Barr (born 1932), British virologist

Fictional characters
 Dallas Barr, fictional character in the eponymous comic book series by Marvano
 Ducem Barr, fictional character, part of Isaac Asimov's Foundation Series
 Onum Barr, fictional character, part of Isaac Asimov's Foundation Series
 Quinn Armitage and Robert Barr, fictional twin characters appearing in the American soap opera Santa Barbara.

See also

People with the surname Barr and identical first names
 David Barr (disambiguation), including Dave Barr
 George Barr (disambiguation)
 James Barr (disambiguation), including Jim Barr
 Joseph Barr (disambiguation), including Joe Barr
 Michael Barr (disambiguation)
 Mike Barr (disambiguation)
 Robert Barr (disambiguation), including Bob Barr
 Thomas Barr (disambiguation)
 William Barr (disambiguation), including Bill or Billy Barr

Barr as a word
Barr (disambiguation)

English-language surnames
Scottish surnames
Surnames of Irish origin